Confined water may refer to:

 Confined liquid, a liquid subject to geometric constraints on a nanoscopic scale
 Confined water (diving), a diving environment that is enclosed and bounded sufficiently for safe training purposes
 Confined waters (navigation), an area of the sea where the width of the safely navigable waterway is small relative to the ability of a vessel to maneuver